Tet or TET may refer to:

Vietnam
Tết or Tết Nguyên Đán, the Vietnamese new year, Lunar new year
Tet Offensive, a military campaign during the Vietnam War that began in 1968
Tet 1969

Geography
Têt (river) in Roussillon, France
Tét, a town in Hungary
Tét District, a district in northwestern Hungary

Character, symbol, abbreviation, or acronym
Tet or teth, tēth, or Ṭāʾ, a Semitic abjad character
tet, the ISO 639-2 code for Tetum
Equal temperament, abbreviated as 12-TET, 19-TET, and so on
Teacher Eligibility Test, a teachers' entrance test
Tet methylcytosine dioxygenase 1, or TET1, an enzyme
Tetrachloride
Tetrahedron 
Tetralogy of Fallot

Art, entertainment, and media
Tet (Morris Louis painting), a 1958 painting
Tet, enormous tetrahedral space station from the 2013 film Oblivion
 TET (TV channel), a Ukrainian TV channel
Tet, a god in the light novel No Game No Life
The name of Latvian telecommunications provider Lattelecom since April 2019

Other uses
Chingozi Airport, Tete, Mozambique, with IATA code TET
TET, a Finnish work practice program
Tet Garcia (born 1940), Governor of Bataan, The Philippines
Tet Wada (born 1973), Japanese-American actor
Trans Euro Trail, Offroad Tracks in Europe
TET enzymes, family of demethylating proteins

See also
TETS (disambiguation)